Paolo Mottadelli (born 8 June 1979) is a former Italian decathlete.

Achievements
Senior

National titles
Mottadelli won six national championships at individual senior level.
 Italian Athletics Championships
 Decathlon: 2004, 2005, 2007, 2008, 2009, 2011 (6)

References

External links

1979 births
Living people
Italian decathletes
Sportspeople from the Province of Monza e Brianza